Samaagamam is a 1993 Indian Malayalam film, directed by George Kithu and produced by Babu Thiruvalla. The film stars Jayaram, Rohini, Sukumari and Thilakan in the lead roles. The film has musical score by Johnson.

Plot
Skaria is a plantation owner and has other businesses. Skaria and Annakutty has a daughter Elsamma. She is a college student  and her father has high hopes about Elsamma. A new sports coach, Johnson comes to the college and she falls in love with him. When Skaria learns about it Skaria makes arrangements for his daughter's marriage to someone of his choice before things get worse. Meanwhile, a close friend of the family and a lecturer at the college, a priest, Fr. Puthentara betrays Skaria's friendship and helps Johnson  and Elsamma to get married. Soon after that he leaves the place for higher studies. Both Johnson and Elsamma move to Chennai. Skaria becomes further depressed. Slowly Annakutty falls ill and is bedridden and she wishes to see her daughter. Skaria is confident that he will be able to take care of her and the medications will cure her but when he finds that the medication is useless, he asks if she wants to meet Elsamma.  However, the morning after he contacts his daughter Annakutty passes away in her sleep. Elsamma arrives with her son Renji.. Annakutty's funeral is done. Renji and Skaria quickly become friends. Before Elsamma and Renji leave for Chennai, he tells Renji that Renji should bring his father Johnson too when they come the next time. Elsamma reveals that her husband died three years earlier and that she is employed in his office. Skaria is shocked and asks why she did not return home. She says it's because of a promise she made to her husband that since her father was not in favour of her marrying Johnson Renji should not be brought up in her father's house. After his daughter leaves for the train station, he goes  there and asks if he can live with her and his grandson so that she need not break the promise she made to her late husband before he died. Skaria leaves with his grandson and Elsamma to Chennai.

Cast
 
Jayaram as Johnson
Rohini as Elsamma
Sukumari as Raahel
Thilakan as Pallivathukkal Skariyachan
Kaviyoor Ponnamma as Annakutty
Nedumudi Venu as Fr. Puthentara 
Jose Pellissery as Eenashu
Kozhikode Narayanan Nair as Principal
Idavela Babu as Babu
Ashokan as Joy

Soundtrack
The music was composed by Johnson.

References

External links
 

1993 films
1990s Malayalam-language films